The February 17th Martyrs Brigade is an Islamist militia in Libya.

Composition
In 2015, the brigade consisted of 12 battalions and possessed a large collection of light and heavy weapons in addition to training facilities. Its membership was estimated at between 1,500 and 3,500.

2012–2015
The February 17th Martyrs Brigade was called on for assistance by the US government during the 2012 Benghazi attack.

In 2015, the brigade was considered to be the largest and best armed militia in eastern Libya. It was financed by the Libyan defense ministry. The group carried out "security and law and order" tasks in eastern Libya and Kufra in the south.

References

First Libyan Civil War
Military of Libya
National Liberation Army (Libya)
Rebel groups in Libya